A Francisation of traditional English "Bullen" coming from the French name Boulogne, Boleyn is the surname of a noble English family particularly prominent in the Tudor period. People with this surname include:

Anne Boleyn, Queen consort of England (1533-1536), second wife of Henry VIII and mother of Elizabeth I
Elizabeth Boleyn, Countess of Wiltshire 1480-1538), mother of Anne Boleyn
Elizabeth Boleyn, Lady Boleyn, lady-in-waiting at the court of Henry VIII, wife of Sir James Boleyn 
Geoffrey Boleyn (1406–1463), Lord Mayor of London
George Boleyn (priest) (died 1603), Dean of Lichfield
George Boleyn, Viscount Rochford (1504–1536), brother of Anne
James Boleyn (died 1561), a courtier of Henry VIII, husband of Lady Elizabeth Boleyn 
Jane Boleyn, Viscountess Rochford (1505–1542), wife of George 
Mary Boleyn 1499–1543), Anne's sister and long-term mistress of Henry VIII
Thomas Boleyn, 1st Earl of Wiltshire (1477–1539) father of Anne, George and Mary, courtier and ambassador
 William Boleyn (1451-1505), father of Thomas

See also 
 Boleyn family 
Boleyn Ground in London, often also known as Upton Park, formerly the football stadium of West Ham United F.C.
Boleyn Tavern, a pub in East Ham, London 
Lady Margaret Butler (1454–1539), wife of William and mother of Thomas
Dan Boleyn, a fictional character in the 1930 novel The Apes of God by Wyndham Lewis

See also
 Bolin
 Bollin (surname)
 Bollen (surname)
 Bowline

Surnames
Boleyn family
Surnames of English origin
Surnames of French origin
Surnames of British Isles origin
English-language surnames
French-language surnames